The Roman Catholic Diocese of Tshumbe is a Latin suffragan diocese in the Ecclesiastical province of Kananga in the Democratic Republic of the Congo.

Its cathedral episcopal see is Cathédrale Sainte-Marie in the city of Tshumbe in Kasai-Oriental.

History 
 May 25, 1936: Established as Apostolic Prefecture of Tshumbe, on territory split off from the then Apostolic Vicariate of Upper Kasai
 March 14, 1947: Promoted as Apostolic Vicariate of Tshumbe, hence entitled to a titular bishop
 Lost territory on 14 June 1951: to establish the Apostolic Prefecture of Kole
 November 10, 1959: Promoted as Diocese of Tshumbe

Ordinaries 
(all Latin Rite)

 Apostolic Prefect of Tshumbe 
 Joseph Augustin Hagendorens, Passionists (C.P.) (1936 – 1947.03.13 see below)

 Apostolic Vicar of Tshumbe 
 Joseph Augustin Hagendorens, C.P. (see above 1947.03.23 – 1959.11.10 see below), Titular Bishop of Caffa (1947.03.23 – 1959.11.10)

 Suffragan Bishops of Tshumbe 
 Joseph Augustin Hagendorens, C.P. (see above 1959.11.10 – 1968.04.09), later Titular Bishop of Sicca Veneria (1968.04.09 – death 1976.04.20)
 Albert Tshomba Yungu (1968.04.09 – 1995.07.22); also President of National Episcopal Conference of Congo (1975 – 1979)
 Nicolas Djomo Lola (1997.05.20 - ); also President of Association of Episcopal Conferences of Central Africa (2002 – 2007.07), President of National Episcopal Conference of Congo (2008 – ...).

See also 
 Roman Catholicism in the Democratic Republic of the Congo

Source and External links 
 GCatholic.org
 Catholic Hierarchy

Roman Catholic dioceses in the Democratic Republic of the Congo
Christian organizations established in 1936
Roman Catholic dioceses and prelatures established in the 20th century
Roman Catholic Ecclesiastical Province of Kananga